Elihu Root (February 15, 1845February 7, 1937) was an American lawyer, Republican politician, and statesman who served as the 41st U.S. Secretary of War and 38th U.S. Secretary of State. He also served as the United States Senator from New York and received the 1912 Nobel Peace Prize. Root is sometimes considered the prototype of the 20th century political "wise man," advising presidents on a range of foreign and domestic issues.

Root was a leading New York City lawyer who moved frequently between high-level appointed government positions in Washington, D.C., and private-sector legal practice in New York City. His private clients included major corporations and such powerful players as Andrew Carnegie. Root served as president or chairman of the Carnegie Endowment for International Peace, the Carnegie Institution of Washington, and the Carnegie Corporation of New York. Root was a prominent opponent of women's suffrage and worked to ensure the New York state constitution allowed only men to vote.

As Secretary of War from 1899 to 1904, Root administered colonial possessions won in the Spanish–American War, especially the Philippines and Cuba. Root favored a paternalistic approach to colonial administration, emphasizing technology, engineering, and disinterested public service. He helped design the Foraker Act of 1900, the Philippine Organic Act (1902), and the Platt Amendment of 1901. He was a strong advocate for the Panama Canal and the Open Door Policy. Root also modernized the Army into a professional military apparatus comparable to the best in Europe. He restructured the National Guard into an effective reserve, created the United States Army War College and established a general staff.

After a brief return to private life, Root rejoined the Roosevelt administration as Secretary of State from 1905 to 1909. Root modernized the consular service by minimizing patronage, promoted friendly relations with Latin America, and resolved frictions with Japan over the immigration of unskilled workers to the West Coast of the United States. He negotiated 24 bilateral international arbitration treaties, which led to the creation of the Permanent Court of International Justice.

In the United States Senate, Root was a conservative supporter of President William Howard Taft. He played a central role in Taft's nomination to a second term at the 1912 Republican National Convention. By 1916, he was a leading proponent of military preparedness with the expectation that the United States would enter World War I. President Woodrow Wilson sent him to Russia in 1917 in an unsuccessful effort to establish an alliance with the new revolutionary government that had replaced the czar. Root supported Wilson's vision of the League of Nations but with reservations along the lines proposed by Republican Senator Henry Cabot Lodge.

Early life and education
Elihu Root was born in Clinton, New York, to Oren Root and Nancy Whitney Buttrick, both of English descent. His father was a professor of mathematics at Hamilton College.

Elihu studied at local schools including Williston Seminary, where he was a classmate of G. Stanley Hall, before enrolling at Hamilton. He joined the Sigma Phi Society and was elected to the Phi Beta Kappa Society. After graduation, Root was an instructor of physical education for two years at Williston Seminary and taught for one year at the Rome Free Academy.

Despite his parents' encouragement to become a Presbyterian minister, Root moved to New York City  in 1865 with his brother Wally and sought a career in the law. He enrolled at New York University School of Law and earned money teaching American history at elite girls' schools. At the time, most law students in the United States applied for admission to the bar after one year of study, but Root stayed on for a second year, essentially a private tutelage under Professor John Norton Pomeroy. He graduated in 1867 with a Bachelor of Laws and was admitted to the bar on June 18, 1867.

Legal and business career
Upon his admission to the bar, Root completed a year of unpaid apprenticeship at the leading New York City firm Mann and Parsons. In 1868, he and several other young lawyers founded the firm of Strahan & Root with offices on Pine Street. He had various partners through 1897, when a disagreement led to the dissolution of his firm and the formation of Root, Howard, Winthrop & Stimson, a predecessor of the modern firm Pillsbury Winthrop Shaw Pittman.

His early work was assorted and menial, but expanded rapidly after he met John J. Donaldson, the president of the Bank of North America, through their pastor. Donaldson hired Root as a Latin tutor and was impressed with his ability as a lawyer, eventually sending him personal matters and small cases for the Bank. In March 1869, Root was hired to reorganize the bank to acquire a state charter. Soon after, Alexander Compton was elevated to the partnership, and the firm was renamed Compton & Root. Root's public profile and professional reputation were enhanced by his defense of Tammany Hall boss William M. Tweed, and Compton & Root grew throughout the 1870s into a varied practice with a primary focus on banks, railroads, wills and estates, and municipal government.

Root was admitted to the bar of the Supreme Court of the United States in 1881. In 1883, President Chester A. Arthur appointed him U.S. Attorney for the Southern District of New York, the chief government attorney in New York City. As U.S. Attorney, Root headed the prosecutions for the Ward and Grant fraud which precipitated the Panic of 1884.

Through 1899, Root took on many other prominent and wealthy clients, including Jay Gould, Chester A. Arthur, Charles Anderson Dana, William C. Whitney, Thomas Fortune Ryan, the Havemeyer family, Charlie Delmonico, and E. H. Harriman. In 1889, Root advised Speaker of the United States House of Representatives Thomas Brackett Reed on his controversial efforts to revise the House rules.

On January 19, 1898, Root was elected a member of the executive committee of the newly formed North American Trust Company.

After moving to Washington in 1899, Root never again became partner in a firm. His public career lasted through 1915, when Root returned to practice in an of counsel role at his son's firm of Root, Clark, Buckner & Howland. Around that time, Root was elected the 38th president of the American Bar Association.

Defense of Tweed ring
In December 1871, Tammany Hall boss William M. Tweed was indicted on charges of deceit and fraud in connection to his real estate dealings and political corruption. Tweed retained eminent defense counsel led by David Dudley Field; Root joined the case on behalf of Tweed's co-defendant James Ingersoll, a furniture manufacturer who stood accused of fraudulently billing the city government for millions of dollars. Root's law partner, Alexander Compton, was Ingersoll's cousin by marriage, and Compton turned the case over to Root due to his courtroom experience. Despite his family's dismay, he accepted the case and joined Tweed's defense in addition to Ingersoll's.

The Tweed case stretched on for years, with the first trial commencing more than fifteen months after the indictment and ending in a hung jury. Four more indictments were brought in November 1873 after the defense's failed attempt to get judge Noah Davis to recuse himself. Root took a minor role in the proceedings, examining jurors and occasionally cross-examining the prosecution witnesses. The jury returned a guilty verdict on two hundred and four counts; Davis imposed a sentence of twelve years and a $12,750 fine, later reduced on appeal. Three of Tweed's attorneys were fined for contempt of court; Root was not among them. Instead, Davis addressed the junior attorneys:

"I know how young lawyers are apt to follow their seniors. ... [Elihu Root and Willard Bartlett] displayed great ability during the trial. I shall impose no penalty, except what they may find in these few words of advice: I ask you young gentlemen, to remember that good faith to a client never can justify or require bad faith to your own consciences, and that however good a thing it may be to be known as successful and great lawyers, it is even a better thing to be known as honest men."

Root took a more active role in the Ingersoll defense, successfully appealing a jurisdictional issue to the New York Court of Appeals. Judge Allen remarked to Root's co-counsel that Root's argument "was not excelled by any in the case." Ingersoll was ultimately sentenced to five years but was pardoned by Governor Samuel J. Tilden.

After Root had risen to national prominence, his work on the Tweed case formed the basis for public attacks from newspapers owned and directed by William Randolph Hearst, particularly after Root opposed Hearst's 1906 campaign for governor. Hearst exaggerated Root's role in the case and implied he had advised Tweed on political corruption before his indictment. Root's fee in the case, paid partly in cash and partly by a real estate transfer, also came in for criticism, with Hearst papers implying that Root had inherited Tweed's mansion. In fact, Tweed was penniless after paying the fines assessed against him, and his heavily encumbered real estate holdings were his lone assets.

U.S. Attorney for the Southern District (1883–85)

Early in his legal career, Root joined the Union League Club, where he met a number of young New York Republicans. Nevertheless, he avoided political office, believing that it would obstruct his legal career. As an example, he cited Robert H. Strahan, an early law partner who had entered state politics. "It ruined him as a lawyer," Root said in 1930. "He got in the habit politicians have of sitting around and talking instead of working." Nevertheless, after his 1878 marriage and move to East 55th Street, Root became actively involved in the Republican Party organization in his well-to-do State Assembly district. He also expanded his involvement at the Union League Club, where his father-in-law was an active member. In 1879, he was elected to the Club's executive committee.

Through the Club, Root met Chester A. Arthur, an experienced Manhattan attorney and the powerful Collector of the Port of New York. In 1879, Arthur and Alonzo B. Cornell persuaded Root to stand for the Court of Common Pleas. Root viewed the campaign as hopeless given the city's Democratic reputation, took no part in the campaign, and was relieved to lose the election. He never again stood for a popular election, other than as a delegate to party conventions, but his association with Arthur rapidly advanced his national profile. In 1880, Arthur was elected Vice President of the United States with Root's support. Root attended the inauguration and was among the friends at Arthur's New York home on September 19, 1881, when the Vice President was informed that President James A. Garfield had succumbed to an assassin's bullet and that he had succeed to the presidency. In 1881, Root encountered another future President: Theodore Roosevelt, who was elected to the State Assembly from Root's district. Root actively supported the young Roosevelt's career by signing Roosevelt's nomination papers, aiding in efforts to sideline a rival candidate, and speaking on behalf of his 1886 mayoral campaign.

Though many immediately expected Arthur would offer Root the office of Attorney General or some other cabinet post, he did not. Arthur later appointed Root as the United States Attorney for the Southern District of New York in March 1883. There was limited opposition to his nomination given that Arthur was trying to force out a political rival, Stewart L. Woodford, who had been appointed by Garfield, but he was approved by the Senate and sworn in on March 12. The role was part-time, with Root devoting his mornings to the Attorney's office and his afternoons to his private practice. Many of his cases were suits for the refund of customs duties paid under protest.

International law
As U.S. Attorney, Root had his first exposure to international law, which would become the cornerstone of his public legacy. He prosecuted two cases for violation of United States neutrality laws against vessels for aiding Haitian and Colombian insurgents and defended the government in the Head Money Cases, a challenge to Immigration Act of 1882 on grounds that it conflicted with international treaties with the Republic of the Netherlands. The suit was appealed to the Supreme Court, where the government prevailed.

Ward and Grant prosecutions
Root's highest profile case as U.S. Attorney was the prosecution for embezzlement of James C. Fish, a partner in Ward and Grant, a Ponzi scheme trading on the name of former President Ulysses S. Grant and his son, Ulysses Jr.. The collapse of Ward and Grant precipitated the Panic of 1884. Fish offered a defense of ignorance, claiming that he had been fooled by the scheme, just as the Grants had been. For six weeks, Root devoted his full attention to the case, including the deposition of former President Grant, who died before a verdict was reached. The jury returned a guilty verdict after a night of deliberation, and Fish was sentenced to ten years in prison.

The Fish verdict won Root praise in the press. According to the New York Sun, "The manner in which he conduct the prosecution... has won him high praise wherever reports of the trial have been published. The cross-examination of the defendant was characterized by exceptional acumen and professional skill, and was made much more effective than it would otherwise have been by Mr. Root's evident familiarity with the details of the banking business." The Mail and Express wrote, "The credit of the result must be awarded mainly to the District Attorney." In particular, Root was credited with vindicating the late President: "The unspeakable meanness of the conspirators in trying to save themselves by implicating General Grant in their fraudulent transactions... was dealt with in terms of deserved scorn and severity by the District Attorney."

Just before his resignation, Root successfully won an indictment of Fish's co-conspirator, Ferdinand Ward. He quietly submitted his resignation to President Grover Cleveland on July 1, 1885. Two other members of the conspiracy were later prosecuted, and Root returned from private life to assist with the prosecutions.

Secretary of War (1899–1904)
In July 1899, President William McKinley offered Root a position in his cabinet as Secretary of War. The offer came on the heels of the Spanish–American War. In general, the war had been a smashing American success, but Secretary Russell A. Alger had come under heavy criticism for his management of the department, and McKinley had requested his resignation. At first, Root declined, but accepted when he realized "McKinley wanted a lawyer to run the governments of the islands."

As Secretary of War, Root actively framed the establishment of civilian governments in the new American territories of Cuba, the Philippines, and Puerto Rico. He also modernized the Department of War.

Root left the cabinet in 1904 and returned to private practice as a lawyer. He was succeeded by William Howard Taft.

Military reforms

At Root's appointment, the Department of War had a public reputation for inefficiency, corruption, and scandals which had characterized Alger's tenure and the war. His immediate focus was reforming military administration, which he viewed as a prerequisite for success in territorial administration or any future military campaign. Root worked closely with Adjutant General Henry Clark Corbin and William Harding Carter. His chief obstacle was Commanding General of the Army Nelson A. Miles; the offices of Commanding General and Secretary of War had long been engaged in a power struggle, and Root's reforms would directly implicate Miles's authority.

He reformed the organization of the Department of War. He enlarged the United States Military Academy and established the U.S. Army War College, as well as the General Staff. He changed the procedures for promotions and organized schools for the special branches of the service. He also devised the principle of rotating officers from staff to line.

Territorial administration
As a result of the Spanish–American War, the United States held military control of Cuba, the Philippines, and Puerto Rico. As Secretary of War, Root was tasked with the administration of martial law on the islands and the eventual transition to civilian government. Under the terms of the Teller Amendment, the United States was additionally bound to return "control of [Cuba] to its people." Particularly in the Philippines, the United States also faced militant insurgency from natives who resisted their transfer from one foreign empire to another.

For this work, he relied on legal advisor Charles Edward Magoon.

He worked out the procedures for turning Cuba over to the Cubans, ensured a charter of government for the Philippines, and eliminated tariffs on goods imported to the United States from Puerto Rico. When the Anti-Imperialist League attacked American policies in the Philippines, Root defended the policies and counterattacked the critics, saying they prolonged the insurgency.

Secretary of State (1905–1909)

In 1905, President Roosevelt named Root as the United States Secretary of State after the death of John Hay. As secretary, Root placed the consular service under the civil service. He maintained the Open Door Policy in the Far East.

On a tour of Latin America in 1906, Root persuaded those governments to participate in the Hague Peace Conference. He worked with Japan to limit emigration to the United States and on dealings with China. He established the Root–Takahira Agreement, which limited Japanese and American naval fortifications in the Pacific. He worked with Great Britain in arbitration of issues between the United States and Canada on the Alaska boundary dispute, and competition in the North Atlantic fisheries. He supported arbitration in resolving international disputes.

United States Senator (1909–1915)

In January 1909, Root was elected by the legislature as a U.S. Senator from New York, serving from March 4, 1909, to March 3, 1915. He was a member of the Senate Committee on the Judiciary. He chose not to seek re-election in 1914.

During and after his Senate service, Root served as president of the Carnegie Endowment for International Peace, from 1910 to 1925.

In a 1910 letter published by The New York Times, Root supported the proposed income tax amendment, which was ratified as the Sixteenth Amendment to the United States Constitution:

It is said that a very large part of any income tax under the amendment would be paid by citizens of New York...

The reason why the citizens of New York will pay so large a part of the tax in New York City is the chief financial and commercial center of a great country with vast resources and industrial activity. For many years Americans engaged in developing the wealth of all parts of the country have been going to New York to secure capital and market their securities and to buy their supplies. Thousands of men who have amassed fortunes in all sorts of enterprises in other states have gone to New York to live because they like the life of the city or because their distant enterprises require representation at the financial center. The incomes of New York are in a great measure derived from the country at large. A continual stream of wealth sets toward the great city from the mines and manufactories and railroads outside of New York.

In 1912, as a result of his work to bring nations together through arbitration and cooperation, Root received the Nobel Peace Prize.

World War I

At the outbreak of World War I in 1914, Root opposed neutrality. Root promoted the Preparedness Movement to get the United States ready for actual participation in the war. He was a leading advocate of American entry into the war on the side of the British and French because he feared the militarism of Germany would be bad for the world and for the United States.

In June 1916, he scotched talk that he might contend for the Republican presidential nomination, stating that he was too old to bear the burden of the Presidency. At the Republican National Convention, Root reached his peak strength of 103 votes on the first ballot. The Republican presidential nomination went to Charles Evans Hughes, who lost the election to the Democrat Woodrow Wilson.

Root Commission
In June 1917, at age 72, Root headed a mission to Russia sent by President Wilson to arrange American co-operation with the Russian Provisional Government headed by Alexander Kerensky. Root remained in Petrograd for close to a month and was not much impressed by what he saw. American financial aid to the new regime was possible only if the Russians would fight on the Allied side. The Russians, he said, "are sincere, kindly, good people but confused and dazed". He summed up the Provisional Government trenchantly: "No fight, no loans." This provoked the Provisional Government to initiate failed offensives against Austrian forces in July 1917. The resulting steep decline in popularity of the Provisional Government opened the door for the Bolshevik party and the October Revolution.

Root was the founding chairman of the Council on Foreign Relations, established in 1918 in New York.

Later career
In the Senate fight in 1919 over American membership in the League of Nations, Root supported Henry Cabot Lodge's proposal of membership with certain reservations that allowed the United States government to decide whether or not it would go to war. The United States never joined, but Root supported the League of Nations and served on the commission of jurists which created the Permanent Court of International Justice. In 1922, when Root was 77, President Warren G. Harding appointed him as a delegate to the Washington Naval Conference as part of an American team headed by Secretary of State Charles Evans Hughes. Root was a presidential elector for Calvin Coolidge in the 1924 presidential election.

Root also worked with Andrew Carnegie in programs for international peace and the advancement of science, becoming the first president of the Carnegie Endowment for International Peace. Root was also among the founders of the American Law Institute in 1923 and helped create The Hague Academy of International Law in the Netherlands. Root served as vice president of the American Peace Society, which publishes World Affairs, the oldest U.S. journal on international relations.

Views

Opposition to women's suffrage
Root was a prominent opponent of women's suffrage. As chairman of the judiciary committee of a New York State constitutional convention in 1894, Root spoke against women's right to vote, and he worked to ensure that the right was not included in the state constitution. He would remain an active opponent of feminism for the rest of his career, becoming the president of an anti-suffrage league in 1917.

Personal life

Family
In 1870, Root accompanied his brother Wally, with whom he had lived in his early days in New York, on a European voyage. Wally suffered from tuberculosis (then known as incurable "consumption") and believed that the trip would cure his disease. The brothers were together in Dresden at the outbreak of the Franco-Prussian War; they followed its progress throughout the summer as Wally's condition worsened. Towards the end of the trip, Elihu had to carry his brother in his arms. They returned to Clinton, where Wally died on November 15, 1870; Elihu paid off his debts.

In 1878, Root married Clara Frances Wales, the daughter of prominent New York Republican Salem Howe Wales. They had three children: 
 Edith Root (b. December 1, 1878, m. Ulysses S. Grant III)
 Elihu Root Jr. (b. May 7, 1881, m. Alida Stryker)
 Edward Wales Root (b. July 23, 1884)

Elihu Root Jr. graduated from Hamilton College and became an attorney, like his father. He married Alida Stryker, the daughter of Hamilton College president M. Woolsey Stryker.

Religion
Root was a devout Presbyterian, consistent with his upbringing. Upon first moving to New York City, he enrolled as a member of the Young Men's Christian Association, served as its vice president, contributed essays on Christian manhood to its literary society, and taught Sunday school.

Friendships and professional associations
Chief Judge of the New York Court of Appeals Willard Bartlett was Root's lifelong friend from their time as young lawyers in New York.

Root shared a love of western big game hunting with President Roosevelt,

Root was a member of the Union League Club of New York and twice served as its president, 1898–99, and again from 1915 to 1916. He also served as president of the New York City Bar Association from 1904 to 1905. He became the president of the National Security League in 1917, succeeding his mentor Joseph Hodges Choate. Root spoke in favor of war and in opposition to women's suffrage as head of the league.

Death and legacy

Root died in 1937 in New York City, with his family by his side.  A simple service was held in Clinton, led by Episcopal bishop E.H. Coley of the Episcopal Diocese of Central New York.  Root is buried, along with his wife Clara (d. 1928), at the Hamilton College Cemetery.

Root was the last surviving member of the McKinley Cabinet and the last Cabinet member to have served in the 19th century.

Legacy
Professor Alfred McCoy argues that Root was the first "foreign policy grandmaster" in American history and that Root more than any other figure is responsible for transforming America into a world power. According to McCoy, Root devoted his time as Secretary of State and as a Senator to ensuring that the United States would have a consistent presence in world affairs, and Root helped to establish the Special Relationship between the United States and Great Britain. Root helped to ensure that powerful business interests and the intellectual elite supported an interventionist foreign policy.

In addition to receiving the Nobel Prize, Root was awarded the Grand Cross of the Order of the Crown (from Belgium) and the Grand Commander of the Order of George I (from Greece).Root joined the Empire State Society of the Sons of the American Revolution in 1895, based on his descent from Elihu Root (1772–1843), and was the second cousin twice removed of the publisher Henry Luce.

Memorials
During World War II the Liberty ship  was built in Panama City, Florida, and named in his honor.

Root's home in Clinton, which he purchased in 1893, became known as the Elihu Root House, and was declared a National Historic Landmark in 1972. The United States Army Reserve Base in New York Mills, New York, bears his name.

The Elihu Root Gold Medal is awarded to the six highest scoring civilian competitors in the National Trophy Rifle Team Match and are subsequently named as team members. The captain and coach of the highest-scoring civilian team are named as the coach and captain of the team. All eight members receive Elihu Root gold medals.

Works by Elihu Root
Articles
 “A Requisite for the Success of Popular Diplomacy”. Foreign Affairs, vol. 1, no. 1, September 15, 1922. (pp. 3–10)
 "Statesman and Useful Citizen" Vanity Fair, 1915

Books
 The Citizen's Part in Government. Yale University Press, 1911.
 Experiments in Government and the Essentials of the Constitution. Princeton University Press, 1913.
 Addresses on International Subjects. Harvard University Press, 1916.
 The Military and Colonial Policy of the United States: Addresses and Reports by Elihu Root. Harvard University Press, 1916.
 Miscellaneous Addresses. Harvard University Press, 1917.
 Men and Policies: Addresses by Elihu Root. Harvard University Press, 1925.

Published addresses
 “Theodore Roosevelt”. The North American Review, November 1919. (p. 754) — A speech delivered for the Rocky Mountain Club on October 27, 1919.
 The Short Ballot and the “Invisible Government”: An Address by Elihu Root. New York: The National Short Ballot Organization, 1919. — This address was delivered at the New York Constitutional Convention on August 30, 1915, in support of a resolution to reduce the number of elective state officers and combine the 152 state departments into 17. The measure was popularly known as the “Short Ballot”.

See also
 List of people on the cover of Time magazine (1920s): October 18, 1926

Notes

Bibliography

Books
  
 
 
 {{cite book|last=Skowronek|first=Stephen|author-link=Stephen Skowronek|title=Building a New American State: The Expansion of National Administrative Capacities, 1877–1920 (Cambridge University Press, 1982) pp 212–247.}}
 
 The National Cyclopædia of American Biography. (1939) Vol. XXVI. New York: James T. White & Co. pp. 1–5.

Articles
 
 
 
 

External links

  including the Nobel Lecture Towards Making Peace Permanent''
 Elihu Root
 About Elihu Root on www.nobel-winners.com
 State Department Biography
 
 
 Cathedral Building: An Index of National Character, by Elihu Root 1922
 CFR Website - Continuing the Inquiry: The Council on Foreign Relations from 1921 to 1996  History of the council by Peter Grose, a council member.
Elihu Root Papers, 1845-1937 (Papers, 1904-1937) from Hamilton College Library, Clinton, New York.
 

1845 births
1937 deaths
American people of English descent
People from Clinton, Oneida County, New York
New York (state) Republicans
American Nobel laureates
American prosecutors
Fellows of the American Statistical Association
The Hague Academy of International Law people
Hamilton College (New York) alumni
Members of the Institut de Droit International
New York (state) lawyers
New York University School of Law alumni
Nobel Peace Prize laureates
Sons of the American Revolution
United States Attorneys for the Southern District of New York
United States Secretaries of State
United States Secretaries of War
Republican Party United States senators from New York (state)
Presidents of the Council on Foreign Relations
Presidents of the New York City Bar Association
Grand Crosses of the Order of the Crown (Belgium)
Progressive Era in the United States
Theodore Roosevelt administration cabinet members
McKinley administration cabinet members
19th-century American politicians
General Society of Colonial Wars
North American Trust Company people
Mathematicians from New York (state)
Carnegie Endowment for International Peace
People associated with Pillsbury Winthrop Shaw Pittman
Corresponding Fellows of the British Academy
1924 United States presidential electors
Presidents of the American Society of International Law
Members of the American Academy of Arts and Letters